Down to Earth may refer to:

Entertainment

Film
 Down to Earth (1917 film), an American comedy romance
 Down to Earth (1932 film), an American pre-Code comedy
 Down to Earth (1947 film), the sequel to Here Comes Mr. Jordan
 Down to Earth (1995 film), English title of the Portuguese film Casa de Lava
 Down to Earth (2001 film), a remake of the 1978 film Heaven Can Wait

Television
 Down to Earth (U.S. TV series), a 1984–1987 situation comedy
 Down to Earth (1995 TV series), a British situation comedy
 Down to Earth (2000 TV series), a British drama
 "Down To Earth" (McLeod's Daughters episode)
 "Down to Earth", a 2000 episode of The Outer Limits
 "Down to Earth", an episode of the French animated show Code Lyoko

Other entertainment
 "Down to Earth" (1963), a science fiction short story by Harry Harrison
 Down to Earth (book), a 2008 Canadian student anthology
 "Down to Earth" (comics), a Wonder Woman story arc
 Down to Earth (concert), a concert for bushfire relief during the 2019–20 Australian bushfire season
 Down to Earth (magazine), an Indian science and environment magazine
 Down to Earth: Australian Landscapes, a 1999 essay and photography collection
 , a video game published by Firebird Software in 1987

Music

Albums
 Down to Earth (soundtrack), for the 2001 film
 Down to Earth (Alexis & Fido album), 2009
 Down to Earth (Jimmy Buffett album), 1970
 Down to Earth (Flight Facilities album), 2014
 Down to Earth (Jem album), 2008
 Down to Earth (Ramsey Lewis album), 1958
 Down to Earth (Monie Love album), 1990, or the single "Down 2 Earth"
 Down to Earth (Nektar album), 1974
 Down to Earth (Ozzy Osbourne album), 2001
 Down to Earth (Rainbow album), 1979
 Down to Earth (Freddie Roach album), 1962
 Down to Earth (Stevie Wonder album), 1966
 Down to Earth (The Undisputed Truth album), 1974
 Down to Earth, a 1967 album by Nichelle Nichols

Songs
 "Down to Earth" (Justin Bieber song), 2009
 "Down to Earth" (Peter Gabriel song), 2008
"Down to Earth" (Curiosity Killed the Cat song), 1986
 "Down to Earth", a song by the Bee Gees from their album Idea
 "Down to Earth", a song by Celldweller from their album End of an Empire
 "Down to Earth", a single by dance act Grace
 "Down to Earth", a song by Brett Kissel from his 2021 album What Is Life?

Other uses 
 Down to Earth co-operative, a non-profit organization based in Melbourne, Australia
 Down to Earth, a 2018 book by Bruno Latour

See also 
 Down 2 Earth, an album by Ras G